Dirk Lochlin Struan (1797–1841) is the fictional main character of James Clavell's 1966 novel Tai-Pan. The title comes from a Cantonese term that Clavell loosely translates as "supreme leader", and Struan is the Tai-pan or head of his own trading company in China, Struan & Company. In Clavell's literary universe, moreover, Struan is presented as the Tai-pan, and his company as the Noble House, the greatest private trading company in nineteenth-century Asia. A Scotsman, "the devil Struan" is portrayed as a tough and resourceful rogue, endowed with vision and determination. A man of extremity, he is capable of tremendous love and terrible hate. He will stop at nothing to protect his home, his family, and the Noble House.

Fictional biography
In 1805, at the age of seven, Dirk Struan began his nautical adventures as a powder monkey on a King's ship at the Battle of Trafalgar, and becomes bound to the sea for life. Struan was 12 years old (1809) when he found service on the East India Company merchant ship Vagrant Star to China. Under the command of Tyler Brock, third mate and future nemesis, Dirk Struan was whipped mercilessly. Dirk Struan vowed to someday destroy Brock.

In 1811 a fateful night in the Malacca Strait, Vagrant Star ran aground on a reef and sank. At the age of fourteen, Struan swam ashore and found his way to Singapore. Later, Dirk Struan discovered that Tyler Brock survived as well.

By 1817, Dirk Struan was a Captain-Owner of his own ship on the opium run. Tyler Brock was his chief rival. Also this year, Dirk Struan married Ronalda in Scotland, but immediately traveled to Macau. Within a few years, Dirk Struan and Tyler Brock dominated the opium trade.

In 1821, Culum Struan was born. He was the son of Dirk Struan and Ronalda. Shortly after his birth, Ronalda and Culum were sent to Glasgow. Ronalda would never return to China. Also this year, Gordon Chen was born. He was the illegitimate son of Dirk Struan and his mistress, Chen Kai Sung.

In 1826, the British East India Company decided to make an example of Struan and Brock. The Company withdrew their licenses and the two men were financially wiped out. Brock was left with his ship, Struan with nothing. Brock entered a secret agreement with another opium trader. Dirk Struan pilfered a lorcha from pirates in Macau. He became a clandestine opium smuggler for other China traders. He relentlessly confiscated more pirate ships. Using them to make dangerous illicit opium runs up the China coast, he made even greater profits.

In 1834, free trade reform advocates succeeded in ending the monopoly of the British East India Company under the Charter Act of 1833. Finally, British trade opened to private entrepreneurs. With the freedom to legally trade, Dirk Struan and Tyler Brock became merchant princes. Their armed fleets expanded and bitter rivalry honed their enmity even keener.

In 1837, Jin-Qua arranged for May-may, his favorite granddaughter, to become Dirk Struan's mistress. She was secretly assigned the task of teaching "the green-eyed devil" Struan "civilized" (Chinese) ways.

By 1838, Dirk Struan was considered the Tai-pan of all tai-pan. Struan & Company was recognized as the Noble House. Business concerns of the Noble House included smuggling opium from India into China, trading spices and sugar from the Philippines, importing Chinese tea and silk into England, handling cargo papers, cargo insurance, renting of dockyard facilities and warehouse space, trade financing, and other numerous lines of business and trade. The company possessed nineteen intercontinental clipper ships. A close rival, Brock & Sons Trading Company, possessed thirteen. Additionally, Struan & Company possessed hundreds of small ships and lorchas for upriver coastal smuggling.

In 1839, Gordon Chen was remarkably intelligent and a very skilled businessman. However, he longed for recognition from his biological father, Dirk Struan. To achieve this objective, he decided to become indispensable to Dirk Struan and the Noble House.

From January to July 1841, events detailed in Clavell's novel Tai-Pan unfold. The Noble House was on the brink of financial collapse and about to be destroyed by rival Tyler Brock. In desperation and upon prompting by Mary Sinclair, Dirk Struan turned to Jin Qua. In exchange for a series of favours and promises, Dirk Struan received a loan of "40 Lac" (approximately £1,000,000) in silver bullion from Jin Qua.

The first part of the arrangement, Struan agreed to certain trade concessions. The second part of the arrangement, Struan agreed that a member of the Chen family would forever be comprador of the Noble House. The third part of the arrangement, Struan agreed to sell Jin Qua a sizable plot of land in Hong Kong with the deed to be recorded in the name of Gordon Chen.

The fourth part of the arrangement, Struan agreed to the "coin debt". Four bronze coins were split in half. Four halves were given to Dirk Struan and the other four halves were kept by Jin Qua. Anyone who presented a half coin to the tai-pan of the Noble House must be granted whatever he asked, whether legal or illegal. All future tai-pan of the Noble House must swear to keep this bargain. This served as repayment for the loan of silver.

Tess Brock and Culum Struan fell in love and married. The couple condemned their fathers' hatred for each other. Tyler Brock disowned his little Tess, a grudging act that has terrible consequences.

Due to the bargain struck between Dirk Struan and Jin Qua, Gordon Chen managed Jin Qua's financial interests in Hong Kong, investing in land and money lending. Gordon Chen seized leadership of the Hong Kong triad. Partly due to assistance from his father and partly due to running protection rackets, Gordon Chen quickly became the wealthiest Chinese man in Hong Kong.

Gordon Chen concealed this information from his father. When his status as Dragon Head of the triad was revealed, his position was nearly ruined. Fortunately, facts were dismissed as lies. Although, Dirk Struan was not entirely convinced.

As part of his efforts to protect his father, Gordon Chen arranged the assassination of Gorth Brock and sought a cure for May-may's malaria. The first half-coin of Jin Qua was presented to Dirk Struan by the pirate warlord Wu Fang Choi.

On July 21, 1841, Dirk Struan was killed in a typhoon before he can fulfil his oath to destroy Brock. Culum Struan became the second tai-pan of the Noble House. Gordon Chen began placing spies on Struan & Company's ships. Gordon Chen raised Duncan and Kate Struan, the children of Dirk Struan and May-may.

The enmity between Struan and Brock is a prominent theme in Clavell's Asian Saga. Dirk Struan and Tyler Brock left many children, legitimate and illegitimate, who take up their respective fathers' mantles and continue the battle. Tess Brock Struan takes control of the Noble House after the death of Culum Struan and brings about the personal bankruptcy and death of her father but the battle between the two companies continues for several more generations. The last descendant of Tyler Brock, Quillan Gornt, dies in a boating accident over 120 years later. After this accident there is no one from the Brock line left to threaten the Noble House.

The romance between Dirk and his Chinese mistress, May-may, developed within the conventions of the genre as a basis for the novel's optimistic theme of cross-cultural fusion. Dirk Struan has several children who feature in the story, including Culum Struan, Gordon Chen, Winifred Dunross Struan, Duncan Struan, and Kate Struan.

Clavell's hero was inspired by the historical William Jardine, and the Noble House of Struan's is modelled on the real-life "Princely House" of Jardine, Matheson & Company of Hong Kong.

Depictions in film
Patrick McGoohan was announced to play Dirk Struan in a film version of Tai Pan in 1968 but this was never made due to budget issues. In the late 1970s Steve McQueen signed to play the role for a reported $10 million fee in an adaptation written by George MacDonald Fraser (who thought Sean Connery would have made ideal casting); however he later dropped out of the project; Roger Moore became briefly attached, but the movie was never made.

Eventually Australian actor Bryan Brown played Struan in the movie Tai Pan (1986), which was a box office flop.

References

Asian Saga characters
Characters in British novels
Fictional businesspeople
Literary characters introduced in 1966
Fictional Scottish people